The Silent Wife is a 1965 Taiwanese drama film directed by Li Hsing, based on Chiung Yao's 1964 novelette.

Cast
Wang Mo-chou as Fang Yiyi
Ko Chun-hsiung as Liu Jingyan

Awards and nominations
1966 4th Golden Horse Awards
Won—Best Original Score (Tso Hung-yuan)
Won—Best Sound Effect (Hung Jui-ting)
Won—Special Acting Award (Wang Mo-chou)
Nominated—Best Feature Film

1966 Asia-Pacific Film Festival
Won—Best Adapted Screenplay (Liu Yi)
Won—Best Cinematography (Lai Cheng-ying)
Won—Special Acting Award (Wang Mo-chou)

The film was also selected as the Taiwanese entry for the Best Foreign Language Film at the 39th Academy Awards, but was not accepted as a nominee.

See also
 List of submissions to the 39th Academy Awards for Best Foreign Language Film
 List of Taiwanese submissions for the Academy Award for Best Foreign Language Film

References

External links
 

1965 films
1965 drama films
1960s Mandarin-language films
Films directed by Li Hsing
Films based on works by Chiung Yao
Central Motion Picture Corporation films
Taiwanese drama films